The list of Pi Beta Phi sisters (commonly referred to as Pi Phis) includes initiated members of Pi Beta Phi.

Notable alumnae

Entertainment

Government

Literature

Science

Sports

Media

Miscellaneous

References

Lists of members of United States student societies